Danny Peyronel (born Daniel Augusto Peyronel, 17 March 1953) is an Argentine-born English rock singer, songwriter, keyboard player and producer, best known for his work in rock groups such as the Heavy Metal Kids and UFO. 
He had an English public school education in Buenos Aires. After studying piano since the age of five, as well as theory and composition, he did further superior musical studies at the Juilliard School of New York. 
Although Peyronel grew up all over the World, including the United States, he considers London his home.

Early years
Danny Peyronel made his debut with the Heavy Metal Kids at London's Marquee Club in 1973. After recording two albums, followed by subsequent tours, Peyronel left the Kids in 1975 to join UFO, as their first keyboard player, where he also sang harmony vocals. Peyronel contributed to the songwriting as well, e.g. "Highway Lady" from the No Heavy Petting album. UFO later released a live album from the period when Danny Peyronel was in the band called On with the Action, which was recorded live at London's The Roundhouse. 
His songs from that period have been included in several UFO compilations and an EMI re-issue of No Heavy Petting, credited him as the initiator of a change in the band's direction, which continued after his departure.

After leaving UFO in July 1976 following several tours on the US, Europe and the UK, Peyronel formed his own band, The Blue Max, and recorded their self titled album for Charisma Records alongside Murray Ward and Ross Elder though his main partner was Robin Millar on guitar and vocals. After a major tour of the UK, Peyronel left England and went off on a whirlwind of writing, producing and guest starring all over the world before returning to the UK. During this time he wrote the title track of Meat Loaf's "Midnight at the Lost and Found". He also guest starred on and co-produced a live album by Riff, South America's leading hard rock band, where he teamed up with guitarist Pappo and his older brother, drummer Michel Peyronel.

The 1980s and 1990s
Back in the UK, Peyronel wrote the words to "Fear", which was included in Sade's second, multi-platinum album, Promise. He participated on an album by Nick Mason from Pink Floyd and Rick Fenn from 10 CC – the Mason-Fenn album Profiles; he co-wrote the only two songs with vocals and sang the lead vocal on one of them, "Israel", while David Gilmour from Pink Floyd sang "Lie for a Lie", a hit in many territories.

Peyronel settled in Madrid, Spain, in 1984, where he guest-starred on an album by Banzai, a metal group led by Salvador Domínguez. Dominguez, Danny Peyronel and his brother Michel, started jamming together and out of this came Tarzen, a power-house hard rock band. They signed for ATCO Records and toured the US with Twisted Sister, and Europe and South America on their own. After two albums and nearly five years together, the group split up and Peyronel moved to Los Angeles where he dabbled at songwriting and collaborating with Desmond Child, Bon Jovi, Aerosmith and Cher. He also produced a demo for a young local band called Razzle, who later became well known worldwide as Lit.

Later years
Peyronel relocated to Milan, Italy, and assembled a band to cut his debut solo album, Make the Monkey Dance, recorded and produced by Marco Barusso, and released in 2005. 
Musicians involved included Sinergia guitarist Luca Verde, bass player Max Zaccaro and drummer Mario Zapparoli. The album included re-workings of UFO's "Highway Lady" and Meat Loaf's "Midnight at the Lost and Found".

Peyronel then put together a new line-up of the Heavy Metal Kids, singing lead vocals and writing. In 2003, they released Hit the Right Button again with the production of Marco Barusso who also joined the band .

In early 2011, Peyronel undertook a tour of the US to coincide with a major re-issue of Make the Monkey Dance on Angel Air Records.

X-UFO
June 2011 was the launch date for X-UFO, a super-group formed entirely of UFO and UFO spin-off MSG members Laurence Archer on guitar and vocals, Danny Peyronel, Clive Edwards on drums and Rocky Newton on bass and vocals.

Peyronel has taken the role of frontman/lead-singer, whilst still handling short keyboard parts. They played their debut concert as headliners at the 'Hard Rock Hell Road Trip Festival' in Ibiza, and are now embarking on several high-profile appearances, such as the 'Aero Rock Starz Festival' in Bulgaria on 9 July 2011. They perform their own versions of the classic UFO catalogue, with a large percentage of the material consisting of UFO classics written or co-written by the band-members.

X-UFO released Vol.1: The Live Files!, a live album recorded at festival appearances throughout Europe and mixed in Hannover by producer Steve Mann.

House of X
Three years of touring and recording as X-UFO led to the band finding their own identity and prompting a 're-branding' as House of X. They completed a new, self-titled album, consisting of entirely new songs, with the exception of a markedly heavier version of Danny Peyronel's classic UFO ballad "Martian Landscape". House of X had its Worldwide release on Escape Music on 24 October 2014.

Opera 
Danny has been singing opera for almost 5 years now as a 'spinto' tenor. He has started back writing songs with his friends and known associates as well as individually. He has also recommenced playing keyboard. He has collaborated with Richie Ranno, a lead guitarist from the band Starz. Danny and Eric Stuart recently joined at a concert jam by Peter Frampton who was producer of Eric's first CD. Danny also went to the studio to record 2 songs to Cheap Trick Tribute CD with Richie, Eddie Ojeda and Frank Dimino.

References

Bibliography
York, W, (1982). Who's Who in Rock, Arthur Barker, Ltd.
Jasper,T & Oliver, D, (1983). The International Encyclopedia of Hard Rock and Heavy Metal, Sidgwick and Jackson, Ltd.
Van den Heuvel, J A, (1990). Hard Rock and Heavy Metal Encyclopedia, Arcana Editrice, Srl.
Fitch, V (1999). The Pink Floyd Encyclopedia, Collector's Guide Publishing, Inc.
Sharpe-Young, G & Reynolds, D, (2003). A-Z of '80s Rock, Cherry Red Books Ltd.
Popoff, M, (2005). UFO Shoot Out The Lights, Metal Blade, Inc.

1953 births
Living people
British songwriters
British rock singers
British pop singers
British rock keyboardists
People from Buenos Aires